Filifactor alocis is a bacterium from the family Peptostreptococcaceae. 

F. alocis is an important oral organism that is associated with periodontal disease and endodontic lesions.

References

Bacteria described in 1985
Peptostreptococcaceae